Smilis was a legendary ancient Greek sculptor, the contemporary of Daedalus, whose name was associated with the  at the Heraion of Samos. Smilis was born in the island of Aegina.

References

External links
Andrew Stewart, One Hundred Greek Sculptors: Their Careers and Extant Works "The Sculptors: The Archaic Period"

6th-century BC Greek sculptors
Ancient Greek sculptors
Ancient Aeginetans